Gibba (pen name of Francesco Maurizio Guido; 18 December 1924 – 7 October 2018) was an Italian animator who did several erotic cartoons in the 1970s and 1980s.

He died, aged 93 on 7 October 2018 in Albenga.

Filmography

Scandalosa Gilda (1985) only the animated sequence for the erotic Italian film by Gabriele Lavia
"E Tanta Paura" (1976) designed the erotic cartoon sequence for the giallo/poliziotteschi by Paolo Cavara. Released in the US as "Plot of Fear"
Il Racconto della giungla (1974) Italian-Romanian co-production (with Victor Antonescu from the Romanian side), also known as Robinson Crusoe
Il Nano e la strega (1973) - released in the U.S. as King Dick and Zi Zi Pan Pan
L'ultimo Sciuscià (1946) - The only example of a Neorealistic Animated Film

References

External links
 

1924 births
2018 deaths
People from Alassio
Italian film directors
Italian animated film directors
Italian erotic artists
Italian comics artists
Italian cartoonists
Italian animators